Kilmory Knap Chapel is a 13th-century Christian chapel, located at the tiny hamlet of Kilmory, in Knapdale, Argyll and Bute, on the west coast of Scotland.

Kilmory Knap Chapel is on Ellary Estate, next to Loch Sween, on the opposite shore to Keills Chapel. When the roof was lost the building was used as a burial enclosure. The structure was re-roofed in 1934 to hold a large collection of Early Christian cross slabs, late medieval graveslabs and standing crosses of West Highland type, from the 14th to 16th centuries. The chapel is an important historical site of Clan Macmillan (of Knap). In the church is Macmillan's Cross, a well-preserved piece of medieval carving, portraying the Chief of the clan with hunting dogs. The chapel and cross are cared for by Historic Scotland on behalf of the State and are a scheduled monument.

Simon Brighton associates Kilmory Knap Chapel with the Knights Templar, suggesting the area may have given refuge to Templars fleeing persecution in France.

Footnotes

Further reading
Wilson Dobie Wilson ''Description of an Ancient Cross: at Kilmory in Argyleshire (1839)

External links
Historic Environment Scotland: Visitor guide

Knapdale
Churches in Argyll and Bute
Scheduled Ancient Monuments in Argyll and Bute
Museums in Argyll and Bute
Religious museums in Scotland
Historic Scotland properties in Argyll and Bute